Anke von Seck ( Nothnagel; born 10 September 1966 in Brandenburg an der Havel) is an East German-German sprint canoer who competed in the late 1980s and early 1990s. Competing in two Summer Olympics, she won four medals with three golds (1988: K-2 500 m, K-4 500 m; 1992: K-2 500 m) and one silver (1992: K-4 500 m).

Nothangel also won eight gold medals at the ICF Canoe Sprint World Championships with four in the K-2 500 m (1987, 1989, 1990, 1991) and four in the K-4 500 m (1987, 1989, 1990, 1991) events.

Nothnagel married between the 1989 and 1990 seasons and from 1990, she competed under her married name.

References

External links

1966 births
Living people
Canoeists at the 1988 Summer Olympics
Canoeists at the 1992 Summer Olympics
East German female canoeists
German female canoeists
Olympic canoeists of East Germany
Olympic canoeists of Germany
Olympic gold medalists for East Germany
Olympic gold medalists for Germany
Olympic silver medalists for Germany
Olympic medalists in canoeing
ICF Canoe Sprint World Championships medalists in kayak
Medalists at the 1992 Summer Olympics
Medalists at the 1988 Summer Olympics
Sportspeople from Brandenburg an der Havel